Gilles Berolatti (born 4 May 1944) is a French fencer and olympic champion in foil competition.

He received a gold medal in the team foil at the 1968 Summer Olympics in Mexico City, together with Daniel Revenu, Christian Noël, Jean-Claude Magnan and Jacques Dimont.

References

External links

1944 births
Living people
French male foil fencers
Olympic fencers of France
Fencers at the 1968 Summer Olympics
Fencers at the 1972 Summer Olympics
Olympic gold medalists for France
Olympic bronze medalists for France
Olympic medalists in fencing
Fencers from Paris
Medalists at the 1968 Summer Olympics
Medalists at the 1972 Summer Olympics
20th-century French people